IXC may refer to:

 InnovationXchange, a UK innovation management consultancy
 Interexchange carrier, a long-distance telephone company
 Chandigarh Airport (IATA code: IXC), a customs airport in Chandigarh, India
 IXC submarine, a Second World War era German submarine
 Ixcatec language (ISO code: IXC)